Colin Ebelthite and Adam Feeney were the defending champions but decided not to participate.
Antal van der Duim and Boy Westerhof won the title, defeating Rameez Junaid and Simon Stadler 6–4, 5–7, [10–7] in the final.

Seeds

Draw

Draw

References
 Main Draw

The Hague Open - Doubles
2012 Doubles